Beautiful Memories is a 1976 vinyl album recorded by Bing Crosby for United Artists Records, and the last album of new material to be released during his lifetime. Eight of the songs were recorded at Devonshire Sound Studios, Magnolia Boulevard, North Hollywood on October 19 and 29, 1976.  The orchestral accompaniment was recorded in London on September 10 and 11, 1976 and Crosby dubbed his voice in Los Angeles. 
Of the other four songs on the LP, one had been recorded on February 26, 1975 (track 9) (see That's What Life Is All About) and two were recorded on January 19, 1976 (tracks 4 and 12) at United Western Studios, Los Angeles. The title song was dubbed by Crosby on November 5, 1976, also at United Western Studios, using the track recorded in London. Crosby was accompanied by Pete Moore and his Orchestra throughout the album and by The Johnny Evans Singers on certain tracks.

The songs from the album were included on a 3-CD set called “Bing Crosby – The Complete United Artists Sessions” issued by EMI Records (7243 59808 2 4) in 1997.

Personnel
Full details are not given for the recordings but the 3-CD set “Bing Crosby – The Complete United Artists Sessions” mentions the following:

The More I See You – Tommy Whittle (tenor sax)

Déjà Vu (As Tho’ You Never Went Away) – Duncan Lamont (tenor sax)

Reception
The UK magazine The Gramophone reviewed the album saying: "Sadness inevitably surrounds “Beautiful Memories” by the late Bing Crosby, which must be one of the last LPs we will enjoy by this splendid gentleman with fifty years of consummate artistry to his credit, although we are advised of at least one more in the pipeline from Polydor. It is not his best album by any means, but Crosby never made a bad one to my knowledge, and there is much of value and interest in his versions of mostly recent pop ballads such as “A Little Love and Understanding,” “My Resistance Is Low,” “When a Child Is Born,” and “The Woman on Your Arm.” It is certainly a very adequate valedictory souvenir from a singer who has left beautiful memories for a multitude around the world."

Track listing
SIDE ONE

SIDE TWO

References 

1976 albums
Bing Crosby albums
Albums produced by Ken Barnes (writer)
United Artists Records albums